Ursula Newell Gestefeld (April 22, 1845 – October 22, 1921) was an American New Thought leader. She founded the Exodus Club which later was renamed the Church of New Thought and College of the Science of Being. Although she had a large following in her lifetime, the organization she founded did not last past her death.

Biography
Gestefeld was born in Augusta, Maine. She had four children with her husband, journalist Theodore Gestefeld, and in the 1870s their family moved to Chicago.

In the 1890s Gestefeld developed her philosophy which she called the "Science of Being" and published numerous works on the topic. In 1897, she founded the Exodus Club, with its corresponding magazine The Exodus, which later became the Church of New Thought and College of the Science of Being in 1904. She became a prominent voice in the New Thought movement, publishing both fiction and non-fiction.

In addition to her other writings, Gestefeld was involved with the creation of Elizabeth Cady Stanton's The Woman's Bible.

Although Gestefeld had a large following of students, her church did not last after Gestefeld's death, and many of its members were absorbed into the wider New Thought movement.

Reference

1845 births
1921 deaths
New Thought writers
People from Augusta, Maine